Yagiz Göktug Tasbulak (born 3 January 1991 in Istanbul) is a Turkish football midfielder currently playing for Kartalspor of the Turkish TFF 1. League.

Taşbulak was promoted to Kartalspor's first team and made his debut against Altay S.K. on 23 September 2009.

References

1991 births
Living people
Turkish footballers
Kartalspor footballers
Association football midfielders